Nicolas Jaar (born January 10, 1990) is a Chilean-American composer and recording artist based in New York. Among his notable works are the albums Space Is Only Noise (2011), Sirens (2016), and Cenizas (2020). He has also released two albums as one half of his band Darkside (Psychic, 2013, Spiral, 2021) and two further albums under the alias Against All Logic.

After folding his record label Clown & Sunset in 2013, Jaar founded Other People and has since released many experimental recordings through the imprint, including works by Lydia Lunch, Pierre Bastien, John Wall and Lucrecia Dalt. He scored Jacques Audiard's Dheepan (2015 Palme d'Or winner) and Pablo Larrain's 2019 film Ema.

Early life
Jaar was born in New York to Chilean parents Evelyne Meynard, a dancer, and Alfredo Jaar, an artist and architect. His mother is ethnically French, while his father has Dutch and Palestinian ancestry; the surname Jaar is said to originate in Bethlehem. After his parents' separation, Jaar moved with his mother to Santiago at the age of three, where he lived until moving back to New York at the age of nine when his parents reconciled. Jaar attended the Lycée Français de New York.

Jaar matriculated at Brown University in 2008; he graduated from Brown in 2012 with a degree in comparative literature.

Career

2007–2011: Beginnings and debut album 

In 2007, Jaar met Gadi Mizrahi and Zev Eisenberg who ran the legendary "Marcy" parties in Brooklyn, New York. After hearing his early works, Mizrahi suggested 17 year-old Jaar put a 4/4 kick drum underneath his largely experimental compositions. This was Jaar's first foray into dance music, documented in his first release on Mizrahi's label Wolf + Lamb, entitled The Student. Mizrahi said of Jaar: "Back then everything D.J.'s were playing was 128 beats per minute. The stuff he was doing was almost half that speed."Jaar spent the next 4 years in the NY underground dance scene creating rough, hip hop influenced house music, releasing such singles as "Love You Gotta Lose Again" and "Don't Believe the Hype". During this time, Jaar made two songs featuring his vocals in Spanish, "Mi Mujer" and "El Bandido", which he did not originally intend to release as they were made as jokes to make his mother laugh and dance. However, he later chose to release them in 2010 in response to noticing a trend of non-Latin DJs sampling Latin American music without compensation.

He released his debut album, Space Is Only Noise, in January 2011 to critical acclaim and four stars from The Guardian. It was ranked #1 album of the year by Resident Advisor, Mixmag, and Crack Mag. Jaar toured the album with his future bandmate Dave Harrington (later of Darkside) and Will Epstein, and was later voted #1 Live Act on Resident Advisor for the three years he toured the record.

2012–2017: Darkside and Sirens 
In 2012, Jaar debuted a live concept called From Scratch, where, in front of a live audience, he sampled records he had bought that day. The first iteration happened in Queens, New York at MOMA PS1; it was a five-hour concert with collaboration from Will Epstein, videographer Ryan Staake, dancer Lizzie Feidelson and singer Sasha Spielberg. He has also performed From Scratch in Boulder, Colorado, and Montréal, Quebec.

On May 18, 2012, Jaar made his BBC Radio 1 Essential Mix debut, which was voted Radio 1's Essential Mix Of The Year of 2012.

On October 4, 2013, Psychic, the debut album from Darkside, Jaar's project with longtime collaborator Dave Harrington, was released to critical acclaim and a 9.0 score on Pitchfork. The band toured the record for the entirety of 2014.

In February 2015, Jaar released an ambient and noise record entitled Pomegranates, which was described as sounding "like broken Middle Eastern instruments half-playing a modal melody amid bursts of hiss". Later that year, Jaar scored the soundtrack to Dheepan, a thriller by French filmmaker Jacques Audiard about a family of Sri Lankan refugees living in the suburbs of Paris. It was the winner of the Palme d'Or at Cannes 2015.

His second studio album, Sirens, was released in September 2016. Rolling Stone named it the #1 Electronic Album of the year. A deluxe version was released in December 2017, containing three new tracks interspersed throughout the album.

2018–present: Against All Logic, return of Darkside 
On February 17, 2018, Jaar released his first album under his new alias Against All Logic, titled 2012-2017. The album, released with little warning and no direct references to Jaar's name, received critical acclaim upon its release, including a score of 8.8 and "Best New Music" designation from Pitchfork.

Jaar co-produced most of FKA Twigs's second studio album, Magdalene, released in October 2019.

In 2020, Jaar released three albums; 2017-2019 in February (as Against All Logic), Cenizas in March, and Telas in July.

Nearly eight years after the release of their debut album, Darkside released their second studio album, Spiral, on July 23, 2021 via Matador Records. It received generally favorable reviews.

Other People 
Jaar founded New York-based imprint Other People. It has published music from artists such as Lydia Lunch, John Wall, Pierre Bastien, Tomaga, DJ Slugo, William Basinski, VTGNIKE, Nikita Quasim, 12z, Sary Moussa and the Terepa collective, which consists of such artists as Kouhei Matsunaga, Laurel Halo, Lucrecia Dalt, Charlotte Collin, and Julia Holter. Other People has also featured the visual & audio work of artists Africanus Okokon and Maziyar Pahlevan.

In 2016, Other People launched THE NETWORK, a web of 111 fictional radio stations done in collaboration with visual artists Jena Myung and Maziyar Pahlevan. In 2017, THE NETWORK became a book, published by PRINTED MATTER in NY.

Discography

 Space Is Only Noise (2011)
 Pomegranates (2015)
 Nymphs (2016)
 Sirens (2016)
 Cenizas (2020)
 Telas (2020)

Against All Logic 
 2012-2017 (2018)
 2017-2019 (2020)

Awards and nominations
{| class="wikitable sortable plainrowheaders" 
|-
! scope="col" | Award
! scope="col" | Year
! scope="col" | Nominee(s)
! scope="col" | Category
! scope="col" | Result
! scope="col" class="unsortable"| 
|-
! scope="row"|BBC Radio 1
| 2012
| Nicolas Jaar (2012-05-19)
| Essential Mix of the Year
| 
| 
|-
! scope="row"|International Dance Music Awards
| 2016
| "Don't Break My Love"
| Best Chillout/Lounge Track
| 
|

References

External links

1990 births
Living people
Musicians from New York City
American electronic musicians
Chilean musicians
Brown University alumni
Lycée Français de New York alumni
American people of Chilean descent
American people of Palestinian descent
American people of Dutch descent
American people of French descent
Chilean people of Palestinian descent
Chilean people of Dutch descent
Chilean people of French descent